An Army of Shapes Between Wars is the second album by the Long Island band Action Action, released in 2006 by Victory Records.

Release
On November 23, 2005, An Army of Shapes Between Wars was announced for release in two months' time. Until the end of the year, Action Action went on a US tour with Men, Women & Children. On January 18, 2006, "Paper Cliche" was posted on the band's PureVolume profile. An Army of Shapes Between Wars was made available for streaming on January 23, 2006 through AOL Music, before being released the following day through Victory Records. To promote it, the band played a series of in-store performances at various record stores on the East Coast in January and February 2006, which was followed by a support slot for Men, Women & Children on their headlining West Coast tour.

In March 2006, the band went on a West Coat tour with Something for Rockets. After this, they went on a cross-country US tour with the Sounds and Morningwood until May 2006. They embarked on a US tour in June and July 2006 with the Matches; Portugal. The Man, the Classic Crime, Schoolyard Heroes, and Rediscover appeared on the first half, while Portugal. The Man, Valencia, Rediscover, and New London Fire featured on the second half. Following a Victory Records showcase at CMJ Festival in November 2006, the band went on a short Midwestern US tour with My American Heart, Pistolita, and Danger Radio.

Track listing

References

2006 albums
Action Action albums
Victory Records albums